Beulah Park may refer to:
Beulah Park, Ohio, a thoroughbred racetrack in Columbus
Beulah Park, South Australia, a suburb of Adelaide